Anisaeger is a genus of fossil prawns first described from the Luoping biota of the middle Triassic of China but also known from the Guiyang biota of the early Triassic. It includes two species, A. brevirostrus and A. spiniferus.

References

Dendrobranchiata
Prehistoric Malacostraca
Prehistoric crustacean genera
Triassic crustaceans
Prehistoric life of Asia